The ESF men's European Cup Club Championship is a championship tournament between national club champions for men's fastpitch softball teams in Europe, governed by the European Softball Federation. After the 2011 season, the ESF European Cup and the ESF Cup Winners Cup have merged to the new European Men's Super Cup Championship. The Super Cup is now the only European men's championship for club teams.

Results

Medal table

References

External links
European Softball Federation

European Softball Championship
Multi-national professional sports leagues